The women's 4 × 400 metres relay event at the 2014 African Championships in Athletics was held on August 14 on Stade de Marrakech.

Results

References

2014 African Championships in Athletics
Relays at the African Championships in Athletics
2014 in women's athletics